The 2022 World Jigsaw Puzzle Championship is the second edition of the World Jigsaw Puzzle Championships competition organized by the World Jigsaw Puzzle Federation (WJPF).  It was held between 23 and 26 June in Valladolid, Spain.

This event returns after two years of cancelation due the global COVID-19 pandemic.

Organisation

The Championship included three events: team, pairs, and individual. Each event had a classification round and a grand final.

Team event

Classification round (2 groups)
Teams of 4 members make 2 jigsaw puzzles of 1000 pieces in a maximum period of 3 hours. Best two teams by country and the rest of the teams (up to 40), in order of classification are qualificated to the final.

Final (80 teams)
Teams of 4 members make 2 jigsaw puzzles (1 puzzle of 1000 pieces and 1 puzzle of 1500 pieces in a maximum period of 3 hours. The fastest team to finish them is the champion. The team must complete one puzzle before starting the other.

Pairs event

Classification Round (2 groups)
2 members make a jigsaw puzzles of 500 pieces in the maximum period of 90 minutes. The fastest two pairs from each country, with the remainder (up to 50) in order of classification move onto the finals.

Final (100 pairs)
2 members make a jigsaw puzzles of 1000 pieces in the maximum period of 2 hours and the fastest pair to finish it win the competition.

Individual event

Classification round (3 groups)
Each individual participant makes a jigsaw puzzles of 500 pieces in the maximum period of 90 minutes. The fastest two participants from each country, with the remainder (up to 60) in order of classification move onto the finals.

Final (180 participants)
Each participant makes a jigsaw puzzles of 500 pieces in the maximum period of 90 minutes and the fastest one to finish it is the champion.

Schedule

Results

Medal table

Participants 
42 countries are represented in the second World Jigsaw Puzzle Championship.

 Andorra
 Australia
 Belarus
 Belgium
 Brazil
 Chile
 China
 Colombia
 Croatia
 Cyprus
 Czech Republic
 Denmark
 Ecuador
 France
 Germany
 Great Britain
 Greece
 Hungary
 Ireland
 Israel
 Italy
 Japan
 Latvia
 Malta
 Mexico
 Netherlands
 Norway
 Peru
 Poland
 Portugal
 Roumania
 Singapore
 Slovenia
 Slovakia
 South Africa
 South Korea
 Spain
 Sweden
 Turkey
 Uganda
 Ukraine
 United States

References

Jigsaw puzzles
World championships